Estagrotis is a genus of moths of the family Noctuidae.

Species
 Estagrotis canescens Hacker & Ronkay, 1992
 Estagrotis cuprea (Moore, 1867)
 Estagrotis plantei Hacker & Ronkay, 1992
 Estagrotis rufalis (Bethune-Baker, 1906)

References
Natural History Museum Lepidoptera genus database
Estagrotis at funet

Noctuinae